Osborne Monday (born 24 June 1985) is a Kenyan international footballer who plays for Tusker, as a midfielder.

Career
Born in Nairobi, Monday has played club football for Mathare United, Al-Shabab, Tusker, Azam and Sofapaka.

He made his international debut for Kenya in 2007.

References

1985 births
Living people
Kenyan footballers
Association football midfielders
Mathare United F.C. players
Al-Shabab SC (Seeb) players
Tusker F.C. players
Azam F.C. players
Sofapaka F.C. players
Kenyan Premier League players
Kenya international footballers
Kenyan expatriate footballers
Kenyan expatriate sportspeople in Oman
Kenyan expatriate sportspeople in Tanzania
Expatriate footballers in Oman
Expatriate footballers in Tanzania